Japan competed at the 2004 Summer Paralympics in Athens, Greece. The team included 162 athletes—108 men and 54 women. Japanese competitors won 52 medals, 17 gold, 15 silver and 20 bronze, to finish 10th in the medal table.

Medallists

Sports

Archery

Men

|-
|align=left|Koichi Minami
|align=left|Men's individual W1
|617
|6
|
|W 150-133
|L 95-103
|colspan=3|Did not advance
|-
|align=left|Kimimasa Onodera
|align=left|Men's individual standing
|628
|2
|
|L 141-142
|colspan=4|Did not advance
|-
|align=left|Shinji Sakodo
|align=left|Men's individual W2
|596
|15
|W 145-144
|L 147-151
|colspan=4|Did not advance
|-
|align=left|Koichi Minami Kimimasa Onodera Shinji Sakodo
|align=left|Men's team open
|1840
|3
|colspan=2 
|W 226-206
|W 215-0
|L 236-223
|
|}

In the men's team open semifinal against United States, a zero score was recorded due to the "infringement of IPC rules".

Women

|-
|align=left|Nako Hirasawa
|align=left rowspan=3|Women's individual W1/W2
|613 WR
|1
|
|W 142-101
|W 96-95
|L 88-96
|W 99-90
|
|-
|align=left|Naomi Isozaki
|593
|3
|
|W 129-128
|W 94-85
|W 91-89
|L 83-97
|
|-
|align=left|Aya Nakanishi
|526
|13
|
|L 127-154
|colspan=4|Did not advance
|-
|align=left|Masako Yonezawa
|align=left|Women's individual standing
|522
|11
|
|W 134-126
|L 95-99
|colspan=4|Did not advance
|-
|align=left|Nako Hirasawa Naomi Isozaki Aya Nakanishi
|align=left|Women's team open
|1732 WR
|1
|colspan=2 
|Bye
|L 191-197
|L 201-213
|4
|}

Athletics

Men's track

Men's field

Women's track

Women's field

Cycling

Men's road

Men's track

Despite being in the bronze medal match, Shigeo Yoshihara and Takuya Oki won the event against Anthony Biddle and Kial Stewart, in the gold medal match, Slovakian cyclists Vladislav Janovjak and Juraj Petrovic were disqualified and were stripped of the silver medals after Petrovic was tested positive for glucocorticosteroid and methylprednisolone.

Goalball
The women's goalball team won a bronze medal after defeating Finland.

Players
Mieko Asai
Masae Komiya
Eriko Kumakawa
Yuka Naoi
Yuki Naoi
Madoka Sano

Results

Judo

Men

Sergio Arturo Perez was disqualified and stripped of his gold medal after being found to be tested positive for an inflammatory drug prednisolone. Makoto Hirose was awarded a silver medal.

Women

Powerlifting

Men

Shooting

Men

Women

Swimming

Men

Women

Table tennis

Men

Women

Volleyball
The men's volleyball team didn't win any medals: they were 7th out 8 teams.

Players
Satoshi Kanao
Masahiko Kato
Yosuke Kurita
Kaname Nakayama
Yoshihito Takeda
Tadashi Tamura
Tsutomu Tanabe
Koji Tanaka
Koki Todo
Arata Yamamoto
Atsushi Yonezawa
Hitoshi Yoshida

Results
No eliminations occur in the preliminaries for ranking purposes

Wheelchair basketball

Men's team
The men's basketball team didn't win any medals: they were 8th out of 12 teams.

Players
Shingo Fujii
Reo Fujimoto
Yasuyuki Hasegawa
Yasuhiro Jimbo
Keisuke Koretomo
Kazuyuki Kyoya
Katsumi Miyake
Noriyuki Mori
Tomohiko Oshima
Takao Sugasawa
Hisanobu Sugiura
Naoki Yasu

Results

Women's team
The women's basketball team didn't win any medals: they were 5th out of 8 teams.

Players
Sachiko Goto
Yasuko Hatano
Rie Kawakami
Megumi Mashiko
Sachiko Minamikawa
Junko Sako
Tomoe Soeda
Naoko Sugahara
Mika Takabayashi
Kyoko Tsukamoto
Chika Uemara
Erika Yoshida

Results

Wheelchair fencing

Men

Women

Wheelchair rugby
The men's rugby team didn't win any medals: they were 8th out of 8 teams.

Players
Masahiro Fukui
Satoshi Ito
Masanao Kawamura
Hiroyuki Misaka
Kenichi Mori
Takuo Murohashi
Shinichi Nakazato
Koichi Ogino
Yoshito Sato
Shinichi Shimakawa
Yoshinobu Takahashi
Manabu Tamura

Results

Wheelchair tennis

Men

Women

Quads

See also
Japan at the Paralympics
Japan at the 2004 Summer Olympics

References 

Nations at the 2004 Summer Paralympics
2004
Summer Paralympics